Whorn is the eighth album by the Minneapolis-based noise rock band The Cows. It was released on March 26, 1996, by Amphetamine Reptile Records.

Production
Whorn was the band's first time working with Tim Mac since their fourth album Peacetika. During the recording, Tim Mac opted for a "live sound," having the band play together as a whole instead of recording their parts individually.

Critical reception
The Washington Post wrote: "This Minneapolis quartet blares and bleats, its shrillness occasionally augmented by the trombone squalls of singer Shannon Selberg, whose playing is almost as atonal as his singing. The band's new Whorn is perhaps not its most abrasive work, but it's hardly mellow."

Track listing 

Jikan begins with a distorted sample of a Japanese woman speaking, that begins at 0:00 ends at 0:06. The sample is followed by almost 10 minutes of silence (0:06 - 10:06). After the silence, there is a brief hidden track of the band performing a faster, funkier version of "The New Girl."

Personnel
Adapted from the Whorn liner notes.

Cows
 Thor Eisentrager – guitar
 Kevin Rutmanis – bass guitar
 Shannon Selberg – vocals, bugle
 Freddy Votel – drums

Production and additional personnel
 Randy Hawkins – recording, mixing
 Tom Hazelmyer – cover art
 Tim Mac – production, recording, mixing

Release history

References

External links 
 

1996 albums
Cows (band) albums
Amphetamine Reptile Records albums